Lisbellaw St Patrick's are a hurling club from central County Fermanagh, Northern Ireland. They are the only adult hurling club in Fermanagh, the club has won the Fermanagh Senior Hurling Championship on 31 occasions.

Club history
In 1968 Adrian Corrigan and Father Peter McGuiness decided to form a hurling team drawing on players in the Lisbellaw area. McGuiness contacted Jimmy McPhillips of Coa and Fermanagh. He and his son John assembled some players and practices began in October 1968.
At 16yrs old, Gerry Breslin was the first Club Chairman in 1969. Jimmy McPhillips died in 1984.

Facilities
Lisbellaw Hurling Club is situated outside the town of Lisbellaw at Cavanacarragh in central Fermanagh.

The club facilities include a hurling field with ballstops and a fence around the pitch. Facilities include changing rooms with a meeting room, showers, and toilets.

Honours
 Fermanagh Senior Hurling Championship (31): 1972, 1974, 1976, 1977, 1982, 1983, 1985, 1986, 1987, 1988, 1989, 1991, 1992, 1993, 1994, 1995, 1996, 1997, 1998, 1999, 2000, 2001, 2002, 2003, 2004, 2006, 2007, 2008, 2009,2010, 2011, 2012, 2013
 Ulster Junior Club Hurling Championship (1): 2008
 Ulster Intermediate Club Hurling Championship (1): 2012

References

External links
Lisbellaw St Patrick's Club website (archived)

Gaelic games clubs in County Fermanagh
Hurling clubs in County Fermanagh